Pedro Guillermo y Guerrero (born Hato Mayor, June 29, 1814 – died Santo Domingo, February 18, 1867) was a soldier, merchant, and politician from the Dominican Republic.  He served as president of the provisional government junta of the Dominican Republic from November 15, 1865 until December 8 of that year.

He fought in the Dominican War of Independence, specifically in the Battle of Azua, Battle of Estrelleta, Battle of El Número, and the Battle of Las Carreras. During the annexation of Spain in 1861, Guillermo was opposed and organized the first uprising at Hato Mayor del Rey on October 2, 1863.

He took became president of the Republic on November 15, 1865, until the arrival of Buenaventura Báez on December 8, 1865. During his government, he concentrated all of his energy on fighting for Buenaventura Báez's return to power.

Early life 
He was born in Media Chiva, in the Hato Mayor del Rey municipality, Hato Mayor province, Dominican Republic, on June 29, 1814. His parents were vegan merchants, José Guillermo and Francisca Guerrero, born in Barcelona, Venezuela. On November 20, 1843, he married Rosalía Bastardo with whom he had three children, two girls who died and a male named Cesáreo Guillermo Bastardo, who later became President of the Republic.

References
Biography at the Enciclopedia Virtual Dominicana

1814 births
1867 deaths
People from Hato Mayor Province
Presidents of the Dominican Republic
Dominican Republic military personnel
Dominican Republic people of Venezuelan descent